The Women's U-20 African Volleyball Championship, formerly known as the Women's Junior African Volleyball Championship, is a sport competition for national teams with women players under 20 years, currently held biannually and organized by the African Volleyball Confederation, the Africa volleyball federation.

Summary

* Notes:
 In 2013, only Algeria, Egypt and Nigeria participated after the withdraw of Tunisia, Sierra Leone and Madagascar.
 In 2015, only Algeria, Egypt and Kenya participated.
 In 2017, only Egypt and Tunisia participated, the tournament was decided in a best of three games.

Medal summary

Participation by nation

MVP by edition
2006 – 
2015 –

See also
Men's U21 African Volleyball Championship

References

External links
 Women's U20 Volleyball African Championship Archive - todor66.com

International volleyball competitions
International women's volleyball competitions
African Volleyball Championships
Women's African Volleyball Championship